Judge Kaplan may refer to:

Elaine D. Kaplan (born 1955), chief judge of the United States Court of Federal Claims
Lewis A. Kaplan (born 1944), judge serving on the United States District Court for the Southern District of New York